Edward Blanchard Chamberlain (July 24, 1878 – February 2, 1925) was a botanist and bryologist that specialized in the flora of Maine. He served as president of the Sullivant Moss Society from 1905 to 1907.

References

20th-century American botanists
Botanists with author abbreviations
1878 births
1925 deaths
Bryologists
People from Bristol, Maine
Bowdoin College alumni
Brown University alumni
Scientists from Maine